Borski is a surname. Notable persons with the surname include:

 Gerard van Wieringhen Borski (1800—1869), Dutch educator
 Johanna Borski (1764–1846), Dutch banker
 Marcin Borski (born 1973), Polish football referee
 Robert A. Borski Jr. (born 1948), American politician

See also
 
 Borsky